is a racing arcade video game developed by Konami and released in 1984. It was the first racing game from Konami. The goal is to reach the finish line within the stages without running out of time, hitting other cars or running out of fuel (which is refilled by hitting a special type of car). The game spawned a spiritual successor, Konami GT (1986), and two sequels, Midnight Run: Road Fighter 2 (1995) and Winding Heat (1996). A Japan-only sequel was also released 14 years later, Road Fighters (2010).

Gameplay
The first two levels contain 4 courses, ranging from grassy plains to an over water bridge to a seashore, mountains and finally a forest area. In the arcade version, 6 stages were contained. The player controls a Chevrolet Corvette and pressing the B button raises the player's speed to around 196 km/h while the A button skyrockets the speed to 400. The player has a limited amount of fuel (100 points) and can earn more by touching special multi-colored cars. If the player collides into any other car or slips on occasionally appearing patches of oil, the car will spin out and if not corrected, may crash into the side barriers, causing a loss of 5-6 fuel points. The NES and Famicom version have a total of 6 types of cars, 1 yellow and red, three blue and one truck. Yellow cars will travel along a straight line and occur in large numbers. Red cars are a little less likely to appear, but they will change the lane they are travelling in once to get in the way of the player. Blue cars vary in the way they change their lane. Trucks go on a straight way, but colliding with them instantly destroys the player's car. Konami Man will make a cameo appearance, flying by the side of the road if the player progresses to a certain point in the level without crashing (not included on course 2 in NES and Famicom versions).

Ports
The game was later released for the MSX home computer system in 1985 and the Nintendo Entertainment System in Japan (1985) and in Europe (1992), and followed the same format as the original. The game was included on Konami Arcade Classics in 1999 and on Konami Classics Series: Arcade Hits for the Nintendo DS. The arcade game was released for i-mode phones in Japan in 2005.

Road Fighter was made available on Microsoft's Game Room service for its Xbox 360 console and for Windows-based PCs on March 24, 2010.

Reception 

In Japan, Game Machine listed Road Fighter on their January 1, 1985 issue as being the most-successful table arcade unit of the month.

In Europe, Computer Gamer magazine reported in 1985 that the "Street Fighter game" was a commercial success in arcades.

Legacy

Konami GT

Midnight Run: Road Fighter 2

Midnight Run: Road Fighter 2 is the sequel to Road Fighter, released in arcades in March 1996, and on the PlayStation in 1997. While the arcade version was released worldwide, the PlayStation version was only released in Japan and Europe. In Europe, the PlayStation version is just titled Midnight Run, removing the Road Fighter connection. Its main selling point was that it allows the player to shift back and forth between manual and automatic transmission during races. Although different from the 2-D Road Fighter, the scenery is similar to other racing games set in Japan such as Initial D Arcade Stage and Wangan Midnight, except the cars are not licensed. The player also has a unique selection of normal cars and tuned cars.

Car list
Honda NSX
Toyota Supra
Mazda RX-7
Nissan Skyline GT-R
Porsche 911 (non-playable)
Mercedes-Benz SL500 (non-playable)

Reception
Reviewing the arcade version, Next Generation praised the support for up to four players, challenging AI, multiple tracks, ability to switch between manual and automatic mid-race, tight controls, powerslides, car selection, and generally fast-paced racing, but nonetheless concluded the game to be only slightly above average, and scored it three out of five stars.

Winding Heat

Winding Heat is the sequel to Road Fighter and Midnight Run, released in arcades in 1996. It first appeared in arcades in September, though most arcades did not receive their units until later. It is an improved version of Midnight Run: Road Fighter 2, though it has more of the normal or tuned cars, and the rules remain the same. Unlike Midnight Run, it takes place on touge roads.

The cabinet came in two configurations: a sitdown version with a 50-inch monitor and an upright version with a 25-inch monitor. Cabinets can be linked to support up to four players.

Winding Heat – Amusement Arcade UK history
Butlins (1999) 
Trecco Bay (1999–2005)

Road Fighters (2010)

Road Fighters is the Japan-only sequel to the original Road Fighter, released in arcades in 2010. The game features 3D-enhanced graphics, with a mounted pair of goggles used to view the effect. Tracks are set in real-life locations and are all based on race courses from previous Konami racing titles, including Enthusia Professional Racing and the GTI Club series. The game includes numerous licensed vehicles, which can be saved using Konami's e-AMUSEMENT Pass containing tuning and customization data. This game is Konami's answer to Sega's Initial D Arcade Stage 4 and Namco's Wangan Midnight Maximum Tune in terms of card-based games, or Taito's Chase H.Q. 2 in terms of sequels.

Its opening theme "Take Me Higher" was composed (together with the system music) by Sota Fujimori and it was included on beatmania IIDX 18 Resort Anthem as a playable song. In addition, the game includes music from beatmania IIDX and Dance Dance Revolution series, as a form to promote another Konami arcade games.

Game Modes
Road Fighter Challenge - Basic Chase HQ-esque mode which offers the players visual upgrades and tuning points for cars.
National Online Match - Online multiplayer against a single opponent. Losers can request a rematch. Winners earn "game points", which accumulate toward a ranking. Players who reach the top rank earn a medal. If a top-ranked player is defeated, the winner takes the medal. More medals earn special ranks. However, if the player loses all of their medals, they are demoted to a lower rank.
Versus - Local multiplayer against up to three opponents (4-player). Players can use any of the cars on their e-Amusement Pass.
Time Attack - Basic time attack mode. Due to online connectivity, there are national leaderboards, visible in-game.
Event Mode - Special events held over a limited time period, updated through the internet. The events require specific cars and areas in order to race; otherwise the player will not be eligible for the event.

Adaptation
Road Fighter was one of the video games based for Manga titled Famicom Rocky published by Coro Coro Comics from 1985 to 1987.

References

External links

Road Fighters 2010 official site

1984 video games
Arcade video games
Konami franchises
Konami games
MSX games
Nintendo Entertainment System games
Nintendo Switch games
PlayStation 4 games
Racing video games
Vehicular combat games
Virtual Console games
Virtual Console games for Wii U
Konami arcade games
Video games developed in Japan
Hamster Corporation games